Pine Bush High School is the central high school for the Pine Bush Central School District, located on Route 302 in the hamlet of Pine Bush, New York, United States.

The school no longer offers the International Baccalaureate degree program. It had been authorized to do so since 2002.

The school was used in an episode of ABC Afterschool Special in 1991 titled “It’s Only Rock and Roll” which starred Grammy Award Winning singer Carol King.

Notable alumni
Joe Nathan, former professional baseball player
Mike Kiselak, former NFL player for the New York Giants, Kansas City Chiefs, and Dallas Cowboys.
Cleanthony Early, former professional basketball player
Joe Landolina, inventor, entrepreneur and biomedical engineer

Controversy
Pine Bush High School has been involved in several well-known controversies over the last 10 years.
In 2012, five Jewish students brought a lawsuit against Pine Bush Central School District claiming that they experienced anti-Semitic slurs, graffiti, physical attacks, and jokes related to The Holocaust during their time in elementary, middle, and high school. New York Governor Andrew Cuomo ordered an investigation into these allegations in 2013. Pine Bush Central School District settled this lawsuit in 2015, and paid the plaintiffs $4.48 million.
In 2015, a student read the Pledge of Allegiance in Arabic in an effort to celebrate national Foreign Language Week. This caused school and community-wide controversy as students and community-members associated the reading with conflict in the Middle East. This incident garnered nation-wide attention and resulted in an apology from the school principal, Aaron Hopmayer.
In 2019, The New York Times wrote a follow-up article about how anti-Semitism still plagues Pine Bush Central School District. The article explains that the school district surveyed a portion of their students and found that 766 respondents in middle and high school said that they had seen or heard anti-Semitism in school in the last year.

References

Public high schools in New York (state)
Schools in Orange County, New York